This is a list of all the golfers who represented Europe in the Solheim Cup from the first staging in 1990 through to 2021.

Players 

+ Selected or qualified for the team but withdrew and was replaced.
* Lisa Hackney later became Lisa Hall. Kathryn Marshall later became Kathryn Imrie.

Playing record 
Source: 

O = Overall, S = Singles matches, Fs = Foursome matches, Fb = Fourball matches
W = Matches won, L = Matches lost, H = Matches halved

Record European appearances 
Up to and including the 2021 Solheim Cup.

Laura Davies holds the record for most appearances in the Solheim Cup by either a European or an American.

Record European point winners 
Up to and including the 2021 Solheim Cup.

Laura Davies holds the record for most points won in the Solheim Cup by either a European or an American.

European country records 
Up to and including the 2021 Solheim Cup.

There were eight players in 1990, 10 in 1992 and 1994 and 12 in the contests since then, giving a total of 196 total appearances.

Family relationships

Annika Sörenstam and Charlotta Sörenstam are sisters. They played together in the 1998 Solheim Cup.

See also
List of American Solheim Cup golfers
Lists of golfers

References

External links
The Solheim Cup History & Results
About.com golf Solheim Cup Records

     
Solheim, European